Mazhory; which roughly translates as "the superior ones") is a slang term used in the Soviet Union and post-Soviet countries for children of privileged people, who take advantage of their inborn privileges (nepotism, cronyism, avoiding due punishment, etc.), often in an arrogant and abusive way.

Meaning

Ukraine

The term Mazhory is used to describe children of high-ranking, mid-ranking, and sometimes even seemingly low-ranking officials in the government, police force, judiciary or army. This term is also used to describe officials themselves as well as wealthy businessmen and their children. They are seen to lead easier lives than normal people, due to their parents' influence. Often they are able to avoid punishment, or receive less severe punishments than usual, when committing crimes. This phenomenon is also known in other countries of the former Soviet Union.

Russia
In Russia the term Mazhory is connected with young socialites rather than with abuse of power; but the term is also connected with criminal misdemeanour of advantaged youth. The term "" (Russian: Золотая молодёжь) is more commonly used in Russia to describe this advantaged youth.

Soviet Union
In the Soviet Union the term Mazhory was connected with children of high-ranked officials who, through their parents, had greater access to Western products than the average young person and could travel abroad more easily.

See also
 Princelings, a term for the children of senior communists in China

Notes

References

External links
 Like fathers, like sons: Ukraine’s untouchables, Open Democracy

Ukrainian words and phrases
Corruption in Ukraine
Society of Ukraine
Russian words and phrases
Corruption in Russia
Society of Russia
Oligarchy
Ukrainian slang
Russian slang